Jamestown Mall was an enclosed shopping mall in Florissant, Missouri, a suburb of St. Louis, Missouri, United States. Opened in 1973, the mall formerly included Dillard's, JCPenney, Macy's, and Sears as its anchor stores. The mall had become increasingly vacant since the beginning of the 2000s. It closed in July 2014  and has been slated for redevelopment as an open-air center.

History
Construction began on the mall in 1972. Its anchor stores at the time were Sears and Stix Baer & Fuller, a local chain based in nearby St. Louis. The Stix store was converted to Dillard's in 1984 after Dillard's acquired the chain. Famous-Barr (now Macy's) was added as a third anchor in 1994, and two years later, JCPenney relocated to the mall from an existing store in Florissant. A movie theater was also added in the 1990s.

Jacobs Group sold the mall to Carlyle Development Group in 2003. At the time, the complex was approximately 30 percent vacant. In April 2006, Dillard's Inc. announced the closure of the Jamestown Mall store.

Carlyle announced redevelopment plans in 2008. Under these plans, the former Dillard's would be converted to offices, and its wing would be closed to retail. The Sears store closed early in 2009. The same year, St. Louis County hired researchers from the Urban Land Institute to analyze the mall's viability as a retail center. The study found that the center was no longer viable as a shopping mall because it overlapped with existing retailers in the area. These plans were canceled in 2009 when the mall developers lost financial support from the county following an attempt to auction the former Dillard's store. Further plans in 2010 called for the demolition of everything except the JCPenney and Macy's stores, with the rest of the complex to be re-developed as a mixed-use center. In June 2011, a furniture store called Central States Liquidation opened in the former Dillard's. The JCPenney Outlet store, which was renamed JC's 5 Star Outlet, closed in late 2013.

In late 2012, gas service to the mall was shut off but later restored. The mall's closure was announced in November 2013 due to the heat being shut off. The closure of the Macy's store was announced in January 2014, leaving the mall with no anchors. Jamestown Mall finally closed its doors on July 1, 2014.

In April 2022, St. Louis county approved a $6 million demolition plan to demolish the mall.

References

Abandoned shopping malls in the United States
Shopping malls in Missouri
Shopping malls established in 1973
Defunct shopping malls in the United States
Shopping malls disestablished in 2014
Buildings and structures in St. Louis County, Missouri
Tourist attractions in St. Louis County, Missouri
1973 establishments in Missouri
2014 disestablishments in Missouri